Prospect Point may refer to:

Prospect Point (Antarctica) is a headland at the west extremity of Velingrad Peninsula on Graham Coast in Graham Land.
Prospect Point Observation Tower  is a tower located in Niagara Falls, New York, United States.
Prospect Point (British Columbia)  is a point at the northern tip of Stanley Park in Vancouver, British Columbia, Canada.
Prospect Point (horse) is the longest lived thoroughbred known on record.
Prospect Point Camp is an Adirondack Great Camp notable for its unusual chalets inspired by hunting.